Pabor Lake is north of the city of Avon Park, Florida. It is a natural, round forty acre lake. About eighty-five percent of the lake is in Polk County, Florida. The remainder of the lake is in Highlands County, Florida. The lake can be used for fishing and boating, but there is no swimming beach.

Pabor Lake is a public lake accessible from Lake Pabor Drive, which winds around the lake's north and east sides. Caution should be used when using this road to keep vehicles from becoming mired in dry or wet sand. The road is nothing more than a sand track and is impassible in wet weather. Part of the road running along the east side of Pabor Lake is almost impassible even in dry weather.

References

Lakes of Highlands County, Florida
Lakes of Polk County, Florida